USS Creddock (AM-356) was an  built for the United States Navy during World War II. The ship was ordered and laid down as  USS PCE-916 but was renamed and reclassified before her July 1944 launch as Creddock (AM-356). Creddock was launched 22 July 1944 by Willamette Iron and Steel Works, Portland, Oregon; sponsored by Miss N. I. Schmidleys; and commissioned 18 December 1945. Creddock departed Astoria, Oregon, 6 January 1946 and arrived at San Diego, California, 4 days later. There she was placed out of commission in reserve 26 March 1946. Creddock was reclassified MSF-356 on 7 February 1955.

References

External links 
 

PCE-905-class patrol craft
Admirable-class minesweepers
Ships built in Portland, Oregon
1944 ships
World War II patrol vessels of the United States
World War II minesweepers of the United States
Ships transferred from the United States Navy to the Myanmar Navy
Corvettes of the Myanmar Navy
Corvettes of Myanmar